Frank Bizzotto (born 30 May 1971) is a former Australian rules footballer who played with Fitzroy in the Australian Football League (AFL).

Bizzotto, recruited from West Preston, played 38 games for Fitzroy from 1991 to 1996, 18 of them in 1995. He had stints at West Preston, Kilcunda Bass, Caulfield and St Kilda City, before retiring in 2002.

References

1971 births
Australian rules footballers from Victoria (Australia)
Fitzroy Football Club players
West Preston Football Club players
Living people